Wild Canary Animation is an American animation studio located in Burbank, California. It was founded in 2008 by industry veterans Richard Marlis and Carmen Italia, and is responsible for producing the Disney Junior animated series Miles from Tomorrowland, whose first season debuted in 2015. Wild Canary was also responsible for the second season of Disney Junior's Sheriff Callie's Wild West and some of the commercials for Mucinex.
Wild Canary now produces Puppy Dog Pals, Mira, Royal Detective The Chicken Squad, and The Rocketeer.  Richard Marlis was the former executive VP of Hollywood-based animation studio ka-chew/Klasky-Csupo, and Carmen Italia was the founder and marketing executive for Italia Partners. The studio has produced numerous shows for Disney Junior with development projects with several studios.

Filmography

References

External links
 Wild Canary Animation - official site

2008 establishments in California
American animation studios
Companies based in Los Angeles County, California
Mass media companies established in 2008